Richmond Tachie (born 21 April 1999) is a German professional footballer who plays as a forward for  club SC Paderborn.

Club career
On 14 April 2022, Tachie signed a two-year contract with SC Paderborn, beginning in the 2022–23 season.

References

Living people
1999 births
Association football forwards
German footballers
Footballers from Berlin
2. Bundesliga players
3. Liga players
Regionalliga players
Tennis Borussia Berlin players
VfL Wolfsburg players
VfL Wolfsburg II players
FC Viktoria Köln players
Borussia Dortmund II players
SC Paderborn 07 players